Pennacchi is a surname. Notable people with the surname include:

Antonio Pennacchi (1950–2021), Italian writer
Fulvio Pennacchi (1905–1992), Italian-Brazilian artist
George Pennacchi, American economist 
Lucas Pennacchi (born 1960), Brazilian artist
Pier Maria Pennacchi (1464—before 1515), Italian Renaissance painter

See also:
Pennacchio (surname)